Valakom is a fastest growing town located on Kerala State highway One, in the Kollam district of Kerala, India, with population 17928. It lies within Kottarakkara municipal town, Ummannoor and edamulackal Panchayat.

One of the famous eco tourism malamel para is near Valakom.
| area_rank                = 
| area_total_km2           = 
| elevation_footnotes      = 
| elevation_m              = 
| population_total         = 17928
| population_as_of         = 2011
| population_rank          = 
| population_density_km2   = 
| population_footnotes     = 
| governing_body           = Gram panchayat
| demographics_type1       = Languages
| demographics1_title1     = Official
| demographics1_info1      = Malayalam, English
| timezone1                = IST
| utc_offset1              = +5:30
| postal_code_type         = Postal code
| postal_code              = 691532
| registration_plate       = 
| website                  = 
| footnotes                = 
| unit_pref                = Metric
| government_type          = 
| native_name              = 
| pushpin_map_alt          = 
| native_name_lang         = 
| other_name               = 
| nickname                 = 
| settlement_type          = Town
| image_skyline            = 
| image_alt                = 
| image_caption            = 
| pushpin_map              = 
| pushpin_label_position   = right
| pushpin_map_caption      = Valakom in kollam, Kerala, India
| named_for                = Fastest developing town by Education and trade
| coordinates              = (8.9545629, 76.8427834)
| subdivision_type         = Country
| subdivision_name         = 
| subdivision_type1        = State
| subdivision_name1        = Kerala
| subdivision_type2        = District
| subdivision_name2        = Kollam
| established_title        = 
| established_date         = 
| founder                  = 
| image_map                = https://goo.gl/maps/n12CqnCgPjXRWmtQ8
}}

Location and access
Valakom is 10 km south of Kottarakkara and  8 km north of Ayoor on M C Road/SH-1 (Angamali-Thiruvananthapuram). Valakom is well connected with Thiruvananthapuram, the state capital and to other major towns of Kerala by road. There is no railway line passing through Valakom. Kottarakkara railway station on the Punalur-Kollam line is the nearest railway station.

Distance from major cities of Kerala from Valakom by road are as follows.

Thiruvananthapuram- 063 km,
Kollam            - 038 km,
Kottayam          - 090 km,
Kochi             - 153 km;
Thissur           - 223 km;
Kozhikode         - 354 km;
Pathanamthitta    - 45 km

The famous pilgrim centre Sabarimala is easily accessible from Valakom and the distance is 108 km. Kottarakara Ganapathi Temple, Kottukal Rock Cut Cave Temple and Chadayamangalam Jatayu Para are the nearest pilgrim

Political representation
Valakom comes under the Kottarakkara legislative assembly constituency currently represented by Adv. Aisha Potty  of CPI(M), and under the Mavelikkara parliament constituency currently represented by Mr. Kodikkunnil Suresh of INC.

Institutions and businesses
Many churches and religious institutions are situated here.  Major banks operating in Valakom include Federal Bank, State Bank of Travancore, Service co-operative Bank Ummannoor, Corporation Bank Ummannoor, District Co-Operative Bank Valakom, Muthoot Fincorp, Kosammattam Finance, and Panamkunnil Bankers. Y.M.A. Library and Sree Gosalakrishna temple are situated at Marangattukonam, 1 km from Valakom. A police aid post is located near the Mercy Hospital Junction (Old Kalachantha/cattle market) which is one km north of the town in SH-1.

Education 
The major educational institutions in the village are the Marthoma Higher Secondary School(started in 1924, which is the oldest one in this locality), R. V. Training College & school and C.S.I. Training centre, college & school for the Hearing Impaired.

 Marthoma Higher Secondary School, Valakom                          
 Rama Vilasam Higher Secondary School, Valakom
 Rama Vilasom Teacher Training Institute, Valakom
 Mercy College Of Nursing, Valakom
 St.Mary's Bethany Central School, Valakom
 CSI School for the Deaf & Dumb

Health 
Mercy Hospital is a major health care centre in this area. There are a few other clinics also there.
Karunya Hospital, Valakom
Twinkle Hospital, Valakom

References
1, source link of census data 2011

2, Data provided by tourism department of kerala about Valakom 

3, MARTHOMA HIGHER SECONDARY SCHOOL, Valakom Valakom, kollam

4,  RVHSS PLAYGROUND Valakom https://www.google.com/maps/place/RVHSS+Play+Ground,+SH+1,+Valakom,+Kerala+691532/@8.9572101,76.8432579,14z/data=!4m2!3m1!1s0x3b06755bf704ad35:0x9c30d404770b4e0d

5, Police Aid post Valakom 

6, Mercy Hospitals Valakom.

7, Twinkle Hospital Valakom

 St.Mary's Bethany Central School, Valakom
 CSI School for the Deaf & Dumb, Valakom, kollam

Villages in Kollam district